This is a list of the mayors and lord mayors of the City of Adelaide, a local government area of South Australia.

The first local government in Australia was formed on 31 October 1840 with the election of nineteen councillors to the new Adelaide Corporation, followed by the councillors' election of a mayor. The first mayor was James Hurtle Fisher and the first council meeting was held on 4 November 1840.

Mayors (1840–1919)

Lord mayors (since 1919)
The Official styled title of the Lord Mayor of Adelaide is The Right Honourable Lord Mayor of Adelaide.

The styled title The Right Honourable, (which has no connection with the privy council) attaches to the title of Lord Mayor, and not to their names, and is relinquished upon leaving office.

See also
 City of Adelaide
 Adelaide city centre

References

External links 
 adelaidecitycouncil.com
 How Adelaide became a Lord Mayoralty, adelaidejmuseum.org
 Civic Leaders, adelaidejmuseum.org

Adelaide

Mayors